Lentzea atacamensis is a bacterium from the genus Lentzea which has been isolated from the Atacama Desert in Chile.

References

Pseudonocardiales
Bacteria described in 2010